Martin Clifford Gray (born 19 January 1944) was Archdeacon of Lynn from 1999 to  2009.

Gray was educated at West Ham College of Technology and Westcott House, Cambridge. After an earlier career as a process engineer he was ordained deacon in 1980, and priest in 1981. After a curacy in Kings Lynn he held incumbencies in Sheringham and Lowestoft.

Notes

1944 births
Engineers from London
Alumni of the University of East London
Alumni of Westcott House, Cambridge
20th-century English Anglican priests
21st-century English Anglican priests
Archdeacons of Lynn
Living people